is a Japanese musician, singer and composer prominent in the soundtracks for anime, video game and tokusatsu productions. He is sometimes called Kami (Kei) by his fans. Kageyama got his big break at age 16, as lead singer of the rock band Lazy. By the early '80s, the band split and Kageyama went solo. He found major success once he started to sing the theme songs of anime and tokusatsu shows. Becoming immensely popular soon after, Kageyama went on to be dubbed the "Prince of Anime/Tokusatsu Songs" and is a main fixture for shows to this day.

Kageyama gained notoriety for his opening songs of Dengeki Sentai Changeman, Hikari Sentai Maskman, Chōjin Sentai Jetman, and Dragon Ball Z. He is the original member and current leader of the anisong band JAM Project. Along with Masaaki Endoh, Kageyama hosted Anipara Ongakukan, a TV show aired on the Kids Station Channel that showed live performances of the theme songs of recent anime and tokusatsu shows. The show was canceled in 2017.

Kageyama is also the voice of Zaruba, a mystical talking ring, as well as the loyal ally and advisor to the titular hero of the tokusatsu franchise Garo, for which JAM Project has performed the opening themes.

Career 
While still a high school student in Osaka, Kageyama formed Lazy with classmates Akira Takasaki and Shunji Inoue. The group appeared on Asahi Broascasting, where they were discovered by musician Hiroshi Kamayatsu. The group moved to Tokyo and released five albums before their initial breakup in 1981. That year, Kageyama released his first solo album on the Tokuma label. He signed with Nippon Columbia in 1985. Columbia recommended him to Toei as a singer for the opening theme of Dengeki Sentai Changeman. The opening, performed under the pseudonym KAGE, led Kageyama to pivot to a career in anisong.

In 2000, he signed with Lantis, then run by former bandmate Inoue, and co-founded the anisong supergroup JAM Project with Ichiro Mizuki.

Personal life 
Kageyama is married and the father of two daughters. His elder daughter, Risa, is a Korean-to-Japanese translator and interpreter, and a former voice actress. His younger daughter, Nana, is a singer-songwriter in her own right and has written songs with her father.

He is an avid cyclist.

Original 
 Kyō wo Ikiyō (Solo Debut Song)
 Suki Suki Suki

Discography

Original albums 
 [1981.12.01] BROKEN HEART
 [1982.04.01] It's LIVE Runnin
 [1982.12.15] FIRST AT LAST
 [1983.08.25] HORIZON
 [1985.06.21] BORN AGAIN
 [2000.04.26] I'm in you.
 [2005.12.07] Cold Rain
 [2007.07.25] 30years3ounce
 [2012.02.08] ROCK JAPAN
 [2017.07.25] A.O.R

Mini albums 
 [2008.07.23] Super Survivor

Compilation albums 
 [1989.02.25] THE BEST OF HIRONOBU KAGEYAMA
 [1992.03.21] Stardust Boys
 [1994.04.21] CYVOX
 [1996.04.20] Hironobu Kageyama Best Album 3: Mixture
 [1997.08.21] Hironobu Kageyama Eternity 20th Anniversary BOX
 [2004.04.07] BEST & LIVE
 [2004.12.22] GOLDEN☆BEST
 [2018.08.06] Kage chan Pack ~Kimi to Boku no Daikoushin~

Live albums 
 [1995.09.30] POWER LIVE '95 CYVOX 〜COMPLETE VERSION〜
 [1998.11.18] POWER LIVE '98
 [2002.02.06] Akogi na futaritabi daze!! LIVE ALBUM - Dai 1 Shou  (Hironobu Kageyama & Masaaki Endoh collaboration)

Cover albums 
 [2018.08.06] Dare ga Cover Yanen Anison Show

Singles 
 [1981.10.01] Kyou wo Ikiyou
 [1982.03.01] Try Me
 [1982.08.25] Hotondo Crazy
 [1983.08.25] Mayonaka no Dance
 [1985.02.21] Dengeki Sentai Changeman
 [1985.09.21] Wakasa de Changeman
 [1985.04.21] Natsu ga Kowarete Iku -Day Dream Blues-
 [1985.11.21] St. Elmo's Fire
 [1986.02.01] Stardust Boys
 [1986.05.01] Honoo no Violence
 [1986.11.01] Wild Boy
 [1987.03.01] Hikari Sentai Maskman
 [1987.07.01] The Headmasters
 [1988.05.21] Sei Toushi Shinwa ~Soldier Dream~
 [1989.05.01] CHA-LA HEAD-CHA-LA
 [1990.03.2] Chikyuu Sentai Fiveman
 [1991.02.21] Chōjin Sentai Jetman
 [1992.02.26] Silent Möbius ~Image Song XY-II
 [1992.07.21] Dark Water
 [1993.03.21] Suki Suki Suki
 [1993.04.21] Skyscraper ~Mantenrou ni Dakarete~
 [1993.06.13] Aka no Ryuusei Hata
 [1993.07.21] Cashian ~Kaze no Hakajirushi~
 [1993.08.21] Tatakau Tame ni Umareta Senshi
 [1993.11.21] WE GOTTA POWER
 [1994.01.21] Hitomi wo Tojite Emilia
 [1994.03.21] Kiseki no Big Fight
 [1994.02.18] Ninja Sentai Kakuranger
 [1994.04.24] WE ARE REYSOL
 [1994.06.21] Do!Challenge
 [1994.07.21] Dragon Power ∞
 [1994.09.21] Detazo! In Daijyougun!!
 [1994.12.21] Mini Yonku da! Let's & Go!!
 [1995.01.21] Kishin Douji Zenki
 [1995.03.03] Chouriki Sentai Ohranger
 [1995.03.01] Saikyou no Fusion
 [1995.07.01] GET WIN THE"J"
 [1995.07.21] Boku-tachi no Start
 [1995.07.21] Ore ga Yaranakya Dare ga Yaru
 [1995.08.19] Chou Kishin ZENKI, Raigou Sei Rin! (!)
 [1995.08.19] Te to Te wo Tsunagou!
 [1995.10.21] Dokkan Beat
 [1996.03.20] Power Up Turtles
 [1996.07.24] Get up! V MAGNUM
 [1996.10.19] IT WAS 30 YEARS AGO
 [1996.11.21] ONE DREAM, ONE LOVE
 [1997.02.21] GET THE WORLD
 [1997.06.21] Take A Journey
 [1997.08.01] "Ore-tachi" no Theme
 [1997.09.26] Ganbare Goemon no Theme
 [1998.02.21] My name is Cowboy
 [1998.02.28] Naseba Naruhodo Robotack
 [1998.06.20] Tetsuwan Tantei Robotack
 [1998.07.18] Tetsuwan Tantei Robotack 2
 [1998.09.21] Power Of Love
 [1998.11.21] Tetsuwan Tantei Robotack 3
 [1999.01.20] Ame no Chi Egao Egao no Chihare
 [1999.01.21] HEATS
 [1999.01.22] SMILE AGAIN
 [1999.06.17] Baseball Tengoku
 [1999.08.01] Win a Fight
 [1999.11.20] Kon no Evolution
 [2000.01.19] Hero wa Housou Naka
 [2000.01.21] Sennen no Soldier
 [2001.02.18] Hyakujuu Sentai Gaoranger
 [2002.02.19] Ninpu Sentai Hurricaneger
 [2003.02.16] Bakuryuu Sentai Abaranger
 [2005.02.13] Mahou Sentai Magiranger (with Akira Kushida & Ichirou Mizuki)
 [2003.05.28] SONIC DRIVE 
 [2005.02.23] Ore wa Tokoton Tomaranai!!
 [2005.08.03] Cha-La Head-Cha-La (2005 Ver.)
 [2006.03.22] Choujin Sentai Jetman (re-issue)
 [2006.03.22] Hikari Sentai Maskman (re-issue)
 [2006.03.24] Eternal Love 2006
 [2006.11.29] Fuuun Musou Ten
 [2008.07.23] Super Survivor
 [2008.12.25] Hikari no Sasu Mirai e!
 [2009.11.25] Progression
 [2010.02.10] Ever Last
 [2010.10.10] Battle of omega
 [2011.10.15] Kiba -Tusk of Darkness-
 [2013.06.12] Yohsoro ~Hoshi no Umi wo Koete~()

See also 
 UFO Kamen Yakisoban

References

External links 

 Anipara Ongakukan Official Web Site
 Air Blanca - Hironobu Kageyama's Personal Web Site
 SOLID VOX Official Web Site
 "Kageyama Complete!" A site with a complete chronological discography.

1961 births
Living people
Anime musicians
Anime singers
Japanese child singers
Japanese heavy metal singers
Japanese male rock singers
Japanese male pop singers
Japanese male singer-songwriters
English-language singers from Japan
Musicians from Osaka
Tokuma Japan Communications artists
20th-century Japanese male singers
20th-century Japanese singers
21st-century Japanese male singers
21st-century Japanese singers
Lazy (band) members
JAM Project members